Guy the Gorilla (1946–1978) was a western lowland gorilla (Gorilla gorilla gorilla) who was London Zoo's most famous resident and often profiled on children's TV shows and natural history productions. The exact day of Guy's birth was unknown, but the official birthday was set by the Zoo as May 30, and he received large numbers of cards each year.

Life 
Guy arrived at the zoo on 5 November 1947, Guy Fawkes Night, hence his name. A baby, holding a small tin hot-water bottle, he weighed just 23 lb (10 kg). Guy was the replacement for the zoo's previous gorilla, Meng, who had died in 1941. Guy was captured in the French Cameroons on behalf of Paris Zoo and was traded for a tiger from Calcutta Zoo. It was arranged that London Zoo would receive Guy. The Paris Zoo Director sent instructions to their game department in West Africa to find a suitable female to mate with him.

London sent a request to animal dealers and zoos worldwide to find a mate, and in 1969 the zoo was offered Lomie, a five-year-old female who had been living in nearby Chessington Zoo. She then lived for a year in the old Monkey House in London Zoo before being introduced to Guy. When the new Ape and Monkey House, the Michael Sobell Pavilion, was opened in 1971, Guy and Lomie were finally introduced. However, after 25 years of isolation, it was too late; they never produced any offspring.

Lowland gorillas are the world's largest primates. Males can weigh between 140 and 275 kg. Guy's dimensions as silverback were measured in 1966 and 1971: he weighed 520 lb (240 kg), was 5 ft 4 in (1.63 m) tall, and had an arm span of 9 ft (2.7 m). His upper arm had a circumference of 23.5 in (58 cm), his thighs 28 in (70 cm), and his neck 36 in (90 cm).

His appearance was fearsome, yet his nature was very gentle; when small birds flew into his cage, he was often seen to lift them on his hands and examine them softly. This gentleness is said to have been a major part of his great popularity.

Guy died aged 31 or 32, in 1978 of a heart attack during an operation on his infected teeth. His tooth decay had been caused by the fact that visitors were allowed to feed him sweets.

During pre-production for the film 2001: A Space Odyssey (1968), Dan Richter — who played the lead ape-man ("Moonwatcher") in the film — studied Guy intently and modelled his acting and mime performance partly on Guy's behaviour.

English musician David Dundas released his album Vertical Hold in 1978, which featured a song devoted to "Guy The Gorilla".

Legacy
A statue of Guy by the sculptor David Wynne was erected in Crystal Palace Park in 1961.
The Natural History Museum head taxidermist at the time of Guy's death, Arthur Hayward, was given the task of modelling and mounting Guy's skin. After nearly nine months of work, the re-creation of Guy was put on display at the Natural History Museum in November 1982. Years later, Guy was taken out of public display and moved into the scientific study collections. As of late 2012, however, he has been returned to public display as part of the permanent new 'Treasures' exhibition in the museum's Cadogan Gallery.
In 1982, Guy was commemorated by a bronze statue by William Timym, located near London Zoo's main entrance, by the Michael Sobell Pavilion for Monkeys and Apes, where Guy spent his final years. He is also commemorated in an oil painting by Timym which hangs in the library of the Zoological Society of London, the charity which runs London zoo.

See also
 List of individual apes

Notes and references

External links
 Guy the Gorilla: a life remembered (ZSL London Zoo, 2007)
 Wolfgang Suschitzky's famous photo of Guy (1958) on the photographer's homepage.

1946 animal births
1978 animal deaths
Individual gorillas
London Zoo
Individual animals in England